Jacques Cohen (born December 26, 1951) is a Dutch embryologist based in New York, U.S. He is currently Director at Reprogenetics LLC, Laboratory Director at ART Institute of Washington at Walter Reed National Military Medical Center (a joint fertility program with NIH), and Scientific Director of R & D at IVF-online.

At the same clinic, he developed methods to treat male factor infertility using in vitro fertilization (IVF). He  also co-cultured human embryos with helper cells to promote growth.

Cohen is known for the application of micromanipulation techniques to operate on eggs, sperm and embryos. Intracytoplasmic Sperm Injection (ICSI) and Assisted Hatching are now routinely used worldwide to aid in helping couples achieve pregnancy.

He is the Senior Editor at Reproductive Biomedicine Online. He has also held faculty positions at Emory University, Cornell University Medical College, and the University of Connecticut.

Early Career and education

Cohen was born in The Hague, Netherlands. In 1970, he went to the State University of Leiden, where he received a BSc degree in Biochemistry and subsequently an MSc degree in Reproductive physiology in 1978. Next, he attended the Erasmus University Rotterdam, where he obtained a PhD degree in Medicine in 1982, for his thesis named "Interaction between human spermatozoa and hamster oocytes".

Embryology

In 1982, Cohen joined Bourn Hall Clinic as an embryologist, working with Patrick Steptoe and Robert G. Edwards on techniques geared towards improving human conception through in vitro fertilization (IVF). Robert G. Edwards was the recipient of the Nobel prize for Medicine and Physiology in 2010. It was in Cambridge that Cohen first successfully froze and thawed a human blastocyst for use in IVF.

Cohen also pioneered the use of micromanipulation techniques that are now widespread among embryologists. He developed a precursor technique of Intracytoplasmic Sperm Injection (ICSI), which is now used for treatment of nearly all male factor infertility diagnoses. Assisted Hatching (AH) is another commonly applied technique aimed at increasing implantation rates among infertile couples. Some of his work, such as cytoplasmic transfer, an attempt to boost development using the cytoplasm of donor eggs to supplement eggs from certain infertility patients, and single sperm freezing, has caused considerable ethical debate.

References

External links
Reprogenetics
ART Institute of Washington
Althea - IVF Reports

1951 births
Living people
Scientists from The Hague
Dutch medical researchers
Erasmus University Rotterdam alumni
Cornell University faculty